Boise Contemporary Theater (BCT) is a small professional theater company located in Boise, Idaho.  Since 1997, BCT has been the only professional theater company in Boise committed to performing a complete season of contemporary work.

History
BCT Founder and Artistic Director Matthew Cameron Clark began producing theater in Boise, Idaho in 1996. In November of that year, along with actors he had met the previous summer working for the Idaho Shakespeare Festival, he co-produced and performed in Lone Star by James McLure in the basement of The Mode Building in Downtown Boise. When Matthew saw that there was an audience for professional contemporary theater in his home town, Boise Contemporary Theater was born and four more plays in four different venues were produced: Danny and the Deep Blue Sea by John Patrick Shanley (Neurolux and The Flying M Coffeehouse), All in the Timing by David Ives (Esther Simplot Performing Arts Academy), the World Premiere of Drive Me by Maria Dahvana Headley (Baccus Cabaret) and Lonely Planet by Steven Dietz (Stage II of The Morrison Center). Lonely Planet, in the spring of 1999, marked the first production for BCT as an official Non-Profit Organization.

Boise Contemporary Theater began a capital campaign in 1999 to renovate a permanent home.  Formally a seedhouse built in 1935, by October 2000, it had been transformed into a theater facility with a main-stage, classrooms, rehearsal loft and office space. The capital campaign ultimately raised $2.6 million.

On October 12, 2000, BCT premiered its first production in a newly renovated theater on Fulton street in the heart of Boise's Cultural District: Steve Martin's Picasso At The Lapin Agile, directed by Artistic Director and Founder Matthew Cameron Clark. The season would go on to include True West by Sam Shepard and The Cripple of Inishman by Martin McDonagh.

BCT has had two productions directed by filmmaker Michael Hoffman: The Cherry Orchard by Anton Chekhov and Waiting for Godot by Samuel Beckett (co-directed with Matthew Cameron Clark).

In 2010, BCT was awarded the American Theatre Wing's National Theatre Company Grant.

In 2019, founding artistic director Matthew Cameron Clark was fired by the Board of Trustees for insubordination, after he refused to fire a staff member but instead raised the money necessary to keep his team together.

Venue
BCT is located in the heart of Boise's Cultural District at 854 Fulton Street.

Its Main-Stage is a black box theater, with 230 seats in nine rows. The seats in the theater were donated by The Egyptian Theatre when they went through their latest renovation. The chandeliers in the main hall as you enter the theater are on permanent loan from the Idaho State Historical Society and were once housed, at the turn of the last century, at the Pinney Theater once located on Main Street between 9th and 10th Streets.

Organization
Boise Contemporary Theater is governed by a twenty-member Board of Trustees and managed by five permanent staff members.

Film screenings
BCT has also raised money through several red carpet advance screening events in Boise. The Bourne Identity, The Bourne Supremacy, and The Bourne Ultimatum. had advance screenings in Boise at The Egyptian Theatre as a benefit for Boise Contemporary Theater. Producers Frank Marshall and Kathleen Kennedy and actor Matt Damon were present at each event, raising thousands of dollars for the theater, and enabling it in 2007 to have its first profitable season ever.

On December 10, 2008, producers Marshall and Kennedy returned to present an advance screening of The Curious Case of Benjamin Button to benefit Boise Contemporary Theater.

Productions

2009-2010 season

The 2009-2010 Season will include The Pavilion by Craig Wright, Animals Out of Paper by Rajiv Joseph, Edward Albee's At Home At The Zoo, and Namaste Man written and performed by Andrew Weems.

Western U.S. and world premieres
Boise Contemporary Theater has had several world and western U.S. premieres. Its world premieres included 'two world premiere productions and one world premiere reading of plays by Maria Dahvana Headley: Drive Me (1998), Bare (2001), and Last of the Breed (2008).

BCT had the world-premiere reading of Love Lies Bleeding written and directed by Don DeLillo, which would go on to be produced at both Steppenwolf (World Premiere) and Boise Contemporary Theater (Western U.S. Premiere) in 2006.

In the 2008-2009 season, BCT produced the Western U.S. Premiere of God's Ear by Jenny Schwartz.  That same season, BCT commissioned and premiered the production of No…You Shutup, a one-woman show starring former The Daily Show correspondent Lauren Weedman.

5x5 Reading Series
In addition to its mainstage productions, Boise Contemporary Theater hosts five play readings per season known as the 5x5 Reading Series. Often a mix of brand new or in development plays and award-winning contemporary plays, notable premiere readings include plays by Maria Dahvana Headley (Author of The Year of Yes), Don DeLillo (Novelist/Playwright, Winner of The National Book Award), and Dano Madden, winner of the 2007 Kennedy Center National Student Playwriting Award.

References

External links
Boise Contemporary Theater
Theatre Communications Group (TCG) Profile

Theatre companies in Idaho
Performing groups established in 1997
Tourist attractions in Boise, Idaho
Culture of Boise, Idaho